Xinwu or Sinwu District is a rural, coastal district in Taoyuan City, Taiwan, home to 49,046 people, of which most are Hakka.

Geography
 Area: 
 Population: 49,211 (February 2023)

Xinwu District accounts for almost 7% of Taoyuan's total land area and is the city's 6th largest district. Local industries include agriculture, fisheries, and livestock. 88% of Xinwu residents are Hakka.

Many rivers flow through the district, including the Shezih, Sinwu, Foshing, Fusing and Houhu.

Administrative divisions
 Xinwu
 Xinsheng
 Houhu
 Qinghua
 Shilei
 Tungming
 Shezi
 Puding
 Jiudou
 Touzhou
 Dapo
 Wangjian
 Houzhuang
 Kejian
 Shenzun
 Kanglang
 Bengang
 Yongan
 Yongxing
 Xiapu
 Shipai
 Xiatian
 Chilan Village

Education
Xinwu has eleven elementary schools, four junior high schools, and two high schools. It also has one district nursery, three kindergartens, other private kindergartens, and a district library.

Tourist attractions
Farms, Gardens and Parks
 Changshiang Education Farm
 Fengtian Health Farm
 Jiudou Mulberry Garden
 Jiudou Village Recreational Farm
 Longshen Pitaya Farm
 Power Farm
 Xinwu Lotus Garden
 Xinwu Flower Leisure Park
 Xinwu Green Corridor
Museums
 Xinwu Rice Story House
 Pacific Bicycle Museum
Fishing Ports
 Yong'an Fishing Port
Temples
 Xinwu Tianhou Temple, 2nd-tallest statue of Goddess Mazu in Taiwan and the 3rd-tallest in the world
Others
 Wangjian Hakka Rice Food Production Center

Transportation

Xinwu is served by Xinwu Bus Station, Provincial Highways 15, 61 and 66, and City Routes 114 and 115. The Taiwan High Speed Rail passes through the eastern part of the district, but there is no station in Xinwu. The closest HSR service is at Taoyuan HSR station in Zhongli District.

Notable natives
 Apple Huang, singer, actress, and television host
 Fan Liang-shiow, politician
 Hsu Kuo-tai, politician
 Luo Wen-jia, politician

References

External links

  

Districts of Taoyuan City